The Sultan Haji Hassanal Bolkiah Silver Jubilee Park is a public park in Bandar Seri Begawan, Brunei. The park was built and opened in 2004, although it is to commemorate the silver jubilee of Sultan Hassanal Bolkiah to the throne as the Sultan of Brunei, which occurred in 1992.

Parks in Brunei